Qareh Chay (also Romanized as Qareh Chāy and Qarah Chāy; also known as Ostūj and Qal‘eh-ye Kordhā) is a village in Qareh Chay Rural District, in the Central District of Saveh County, Markazi Province, Iran. At the 2006 census, its population was 854, in 170 families.

References 

Populated places in Saveh County